The Bogor Botanical Gardens is a botanical garden located in Bogor, Indonesia, 60 km south of central Jakarta. It is currently operated by Indonesian Institute of Sciences (Indonesian: Lembaga Ilmu Pengetahuan Indonesia or LIPI). The garden is located in the city center and adjoin the presidential palace compound of Istana Bogor. The geographic position of Bogor means it rains almost daily, even in the dry season. This makes the garden an advantageous location for the cultivation of tropical plants.

Founded in 1817 by the order of the government of the Dutch East Indies, the garden thrived under the leadership of many renowned botanists including Johannes Elias Teijsmann, Rudolph Herman Christiaan Carel Scheffer, and Melchior Treub. Since its foundation, the Bogor botanical garden has served as a major research center for agriculture and horticulture. It is the oldest botanical garden in Southeast Asia.

History

Background

The area that is now Bogor Botanical Gardens was part of the samida (man-made forest) that was established at least around the era when Sri Baduga Maharaja (Prabu Siliwangi, 1474–1513) ruled the Sunda Kingdom, as written in the Batutulis inscription. This forest was created to protect seeds of rare trees. The forest remained neglected after the Sundanese kingdom was destroyed in the 16th century. In 1744 the Dutch East India Company established a garden and mansion at the site of the present botanical gardens in Buitenzorg (now known as Bogor).

After the successful British invasion of Java in 1811, Stamford Raffles was appointed as the island's lieutenant-governor, and he took Buitenzorg Palace as his residence. During his rule in the palace, he had the garden re-landscaped into English-style garden. His wife, Olivia Mariamne Raffles, died in Buitenzorg on November 26, 1814, and was buried in Batavia. A memorial monument was built in the garden, as a commemoration for her.

's Lands Plantentuin te Buitenzorg

When the Anglo-Dutch Treaty came into effect, the Netherlands in 1816 sent a ship with officials to resume control of the colony. Among those on board was the German-born botanist Caspar Georg Carl Reinwardt, who was appointed as head of agriculture, arts and science of the colony. A year later he proposed the establishment of a botanical garden, a move which was supported by Governor-General Van der Capellen. The garden was officially founded on May 18, 1817, next to the palace grounds through a collaboration with two botanists, William Kent from Holland and James Hooper from Kew. He became its first director for five years and gathered plants and seeds of economic potential from all over the archipelago for cultivation. Much of his taxonomic work was catalogued by his predecessor Carl Ludwig Blume in 1823, who recorded 914 plants in the garden.

In 1830, Johannes Elias Teijsmann, a Dutch botanist, became curator of Bogor Botanic Garden and spent more than 50 years developing the garden. Seven years later Justus Carl Hasskarl was appointed as his assistant curator and convinced the director to re-arrange the plantings in the garden by taxonomic families. Hasskarl proposed starting a library, which opened in 1842 as the Bibliotheca Bogoriensis, and constructed a separate building for the Herbarium Bogoriense, which opened in 1844. J. Teijsmann wrote the second catalogue of plants which listed more than 2800 species by 1844. He also has the garden significantly expanded in 1852, with a  new garden branch laid down near the mountainous town of Cibodas.

In 1848 the garden received four seeds of West African oil palm, these trees were believed to be the mother tree in Southeast Asia from which numerous descendants were produced to support the growth of the palm oil industry in the region. However, the last original mother plant died in 1933. The garden also played major role in the introduction of Cinchona trees to Java in 1854, which would ultimately make the island the largest producer of quinine bark for malaria treatment. Later J. Teijsmann had the Botanic Garden detached from the palace garden as an independent institution on May 30, 1868.

The growth in economy and the effective directorship of Rudolph Scheffer and Melchior Treub, fueled the maturation of the garden as a leading regional center for biological study. In 1876 R. Scheffer, who was keen on agriculture development, founded the "economic garden" some distance from Buitenzorg. There he had culture crops such as coffee, rubber, tobacco, soy and rice, cultivated and experimented. In 1880, M. Treub became director of the garden and organized it into elaborate institutions. He founded the botanical laboratory (1884), the Zoologicum Bogoriense (1894) and a marine research laboratory (1904). Under his leadership, fundamental research was successfully completed on diseases that threatened plants of economic importance, such as the coffee-leaf fungal disease and the sereh-disease on sugarcane plants.

The garden enjoyed wide international attention and was regularly visited by botanists and biologists from various countries to conduct research. This led to the opening of the new Treub's laboratory in 1914. A shortage of land occurred in 1927 due to the growing plants collection. Therefore, the garden was extended east of the Ciliwung river. Part of the new section was arranged in similar manner to the main garden, with the rest laid out as large lawns, avenues, ponds, teahouses and glasshouses for orchids. Astrid Avenue was laid out there to honor Princess Astrid of Belgium's visit in 1928; the avenue was decorated with spectacular displays of canna lilies of various colors.

A new branch of the garden was opened near the town of Purwodadi in East Java, under the direction of the acting director Lourens Baas Becking on January 30, 1941. The new garden was intended for tropical-dry plants cultivation. However, before much could be done to develop the new garden, the Dutch East Indies would soon join World War II.

In March 1942 the Japanese marched into Bogor and a year later took over the directorship of both the garden and the herbarium. Two Japanese botanists were appointed in charge of the botanic garden, Professor Takenoshin Nakai (中井猛之進) as director and Kanehira (兼平) as head of the herbarium. These two men strove to protect the garden from Japanese soldiers who planned to have the trees from the garden cut down for war lumber supplies. Under the Japanese the garden was renamed Shokubutsuen (植物園; Botanical Garden).

Kebun Raya Bogor
The Dutch returned to Indonesia after the Japanese surrendered and resumed management of the garden from 1945 to 1949. After Dutch recognition of Indonesia as a sovereign state, the Ministry of Agriculture took over the management of the garden and renamed 's Lands Plantentuin te Buitenzorg to "Institute of Nature Study" (Lembaga Pusat Penyelidikan Alam; LLPA) and the garden "Kebun Raya" (Great Garden). Kusnoto Setyodiwirjo became the first Indonesian curator, who eventually to become head of the garden in 1959.

In 1962, the garden and all research institutes associated with it became part of "Lembaga Biologi Nasional" (LBN; National Biological Institute), with Otto Soemarwoto appointed as director in 1964. He promoted scientific biological research at the garden, which would ultimately bring various benefits to pharmaceutical industries and agriculture development in Indonesia. Later in 1986, the National Biological Institute (LBN) was re-organised and split into the "Pusat Penelitian Biologi" (Puslitbang Biologi; Research and Development Centre for Biology), with the garden as a separate body.

Recent events
On May 16, 2006, the Indonesian Institute of Sciences (LIPI) celebrated its 189th anniversary in collaboration with the German Embassy. During the event a monument dedicated to Reinwardt was placed near Gunting pond. The anniversary was accompanied by the ASEAN-China Workshop Botanical Garden on Management and Plant Conservation event, which took place in the garden. At the end of the celebration, several trees were planted by the attending 10 ministries of ASEAN.

However, on the first of June 2006, a storm hit Bogor and many trees and plants in the garden that were more than 100 years old were damaged. As a result, the garden was closed a week for replanting and repair.

In 2009, an orchidarium was opened nearby the orchid house to celebrate the 192nd anniversary of the botanic gardens.

Features and layout
The garden is divided by the Ciliwung river and has three bridges. The main gate is located in the south and is where most of the garden facilities are concentrated, such as ticket purchasing booth, Treub's laboratory, Nusa Indah Guesthouse, plant/souvenir shops, the library and the conservation building. The precinct east of Ciliwung was laid out in 1927 with facilities as the mosque, cafes, Herbarium, orchid section and Wisma Tamu guesthouse, near Astrid's avenue.

Today the garden contains 13,983 specimens of trees and plants, belonging to 3373 species, 1257 genera and 218 families. There are 288 species (88 genera) of exceptional palms along lawns and avenues. The gardens are a refuge for more than 50 different varieties of birds and for groups of bats roosting high in the trees.

In 1852, the Cibodas Botanical Gardens was founded as an extension of the Bogor Garden at the town of Cibodas, roughly 45 kilometers to the southeast of Bogor. A branch of the garden was opened in 1941 near the town of Purwodadi, and later in 1959 another branch was opened in Bali.

Gunting Pond
South of the Bogor palace, the man-made pond served as habitat for wildlife of Kebun Raya Bogor. One of the most notable inhabitants of the pond is Victoria amazonica. The seed of the plant was sent from Amsterdam Botanical Garden in 1860. The monuments dedicated to Raffles' wife and Reinwardt are located near the pond.

Dutch cemetery
Nearby the Bogor palace's bamboo collection section there is a small cemetery with Dutch tombstones. One of its notable tombs belonged to the former governor general D.J. De Eerens who was in office from 1836 to 1840. There are 42 gravestones with 38 identified persons, the oldest gravestone dates back to May 2, 1784.

Araceae Garden
Situated behind the seed bank of the garden, an area devoted to Araceae species of flora was built in 2010. This garden consists mainly of types of Schismatoglottis, Homalomena, Colocasia and some types of vines as Philodendron, Raphidophora. Approximately 10 trees with a height of more than 2 m have been planted in this garden area, functioning as a protection from direct sun exposure.

Teijsmann Garden

A small garden with a French rose garden layout was built in 1884 by M. Treub, as its name the garden was built as a memoir of Johannes Elias Teijsmann for his contribution to the garden's development. At the center of the garden lies the Teijsmann monument, erected using granite from Berlin.

Medicine Garden
This section of the garden contains plants that are commonly used for medicine ingredients and herbalism. Plants are separated into different sections according to their size and species. Descriptions of each of the different plants and their purpose as medicine ingredients are written for visitors.

Mexican Garden
A small patch of the botanical garden is dedicated to desert plants. There are roughly 100 species of cactus, agave, yucca and succulent plants from around Asia and the Americas.

Soedjana Kassan Garden

This garden is located at the north-eastern corner of the botanic garden and was built to commemorate Soedjana Kassan, who was head of Bogor Botanical Garden from 1959 to 1964. At the center of the garden, there are plants which are arranged to form Indonesia's national symbol of Garuda.

Orchids
Bogor Botanic Garden's collection of orchids focuses primarily on wild species, numbering approximately 500 species from over 100 genera. Grammatophyllum speciosum, the largest orchid species in the world is also part of the collection. The specimens seen in the garden's collections are either the original specimens gathered from the forest, or progeny of those specimens which have been propagated. Although the orchid collection at the Bogor Botanic Garden began much earlier, it was not until 1927 that the collection was moved into greenhouses. Beginning in 1994, the Bogor, Bali and Cibodas Gardens renovated their orchid houses.

The Botanic Garden Orchid section are divided into:
 Glasshouses - separated among hybrid and non-hybrid orchid species.
 Orchidarium - area for breeding orchids.

Amorphophallus titanum
Bogor Botanical Gardens has five Amorphophallus titanum plants in its collections, all from Pagar Alam, South Sumatra. This represents the greatest number of specimens among the botanical collection. The latest flowering events took place in January 2011 and on July 3, 2011.

Treub Laboratory
Treub's Laboratory opened on December 1, 1884. However the current building was built in 1914 to honor the botanist. The laboratory functions as a research facility for Puslitbang biologi's konservasi ex Situ (Conservation of species outside their original habitat). There are several branches of laboratories and facilities inside the building which is dedicated to different research as follows: Molecular Lab, Anatomy-Morphology Lab, Seed Conservation Lab, Ecological Conservation Lab and Greenhouses.

Bogor Zoology Museum

Situated nearby the laboratory and main gate of the garden, the museum started as a small laboratory founded in August 1894 and was used as a research facility for pest/insect control. The museum has an area of 1500 meter square and contains preserved collection of 10,000 species of insects and 2000 species of other fauna.

Guesthouses
There are two guesthouses located in the Botanic Garden. Nusa Indah Guesthouse was built in 1914, located next to the laboratory and museum. It was formerly used as a residence for directors of Bogor Botanical Garden. The second guesthouse is named Guesthouse Pinus, which was built during princess Astrid's visit in 1929.

Directors of the garden

1817–1822 : Caspar Georg Carl Reinwardt (1773–1854)
1823–1826 : Carl Ludwig Blume (1789–1862)
1830–1869 : Johannes Elias Teijsmann (1808–1882)
1869–1880 : Rudolph Herman Christiaan Carel Scheffer (1844–1880)
1880–1910 : Melchior Treub (1851–1910)
1910–1918 : J.C. Koningsberger
1918–1932 : Willem Marius Docters van Leeuwen (1880–1960)
1932–1939 : K.W. Dammerman
1939–1940 : L.G.M. Baas Becking
1940–1941 : T.H. Honert
1941–1943 : Dirk Fok van Slooten (1891–1953)
1943–1945 : Takenoshin Nakai (1882–1952)
1946–1948 : L.G.M. Baas Becking
1948–1949 : Dirk Fok van Slooten
1949–1959 : Kusnoto Setyodiwirjo
1959–1969 : Soedjana Kassan
1969–1981 : Didin Sastrapradja
1981–1983 : Made Sri Prana
1983–1987 : Usep Sutisna
1987–1990 : Sampurno Kadarsan
1990-1997 : Suhirman
1997-2002 : Dedi Darnaedi
2002-2008 : Irawati
2008-2013 : Mustaid Siregar
2013-2019 : Didik Widyatmoko
2019–present : R. Hendrian

Gallery

See also

Bogor Agricultural University
Hendrik de Wit
List of botanical gardens

References

 Weber, A & Wille R.-J., Laborious Transformations: Plants and Politics at Bogor Botanical Gardens Studium (2018). Open access special issue on the history of the botanical garden in Bogor. For access see here: http://triggered.edina.clockss.org/ServeContent?url=http%3A%2F%2Fwww.gewina-studium.nl%2F589%2Fvolume%2F11%2Fissue%2F3%2F
Levelink, J., et al. (1997). Four Guided Walks: Bogor Botanic Garden.
 Hiroaki Hatta, Keiko Hashiba, and Mujahidin (2006). Tree watching tour of Bogor Botanic Garden (in Japanese and English). Available for sale in the Orchid House on the eastern side of the Bogor Botanic Gardens. kicaupedia.net
 Francis Ng and Gregori Hambali (1999). Bogor: The Botanic Garden. Printed by SMT Grafika Desa Putera, Jakarta.

Further reading
History of the Buitenzorg Botanical Gardens, Part 1, 1889 Mededeelingen uit 's Lands Plntentuin, VI
Weber, A & Wille R.-J., Laborious Transformations: Plants and Politics at Bogor Botanical Gardens Studium (2018). Special issue of the journal Studium, for free access click here: http://triggered.edina.clockss.org/ServeContent?url=http%3A%2F%2Fwww.gewina-studium.nl%2F589%2Fvolume%2F11%2Fissue%2F3%2F

External links
Indonesian Botanic Gardens
Official website

Botanical research institutes
Botanical gardens in Indonesia
Tourist attractions in West Java
Geography of West Java
Bogor
Herbaria in Asia